Cristóbal de Rojas (1555 in Baeza – 1614 in Cadiz) was a Spanish military engineer and architect. 
He is known for working as an assistant to Juan de Herrera in the construction of the monastery of El Escorial.

Biography
Cristóbal de Rojas was born in Baeza in 1555.
He was in Seville in 1586, where he acquired a considerable reputation as an architect. 
His best known work in this city is the Tabernacle Church, which he designed.
The project was later begun by Alonso de Vandelvira and Miguel de Zumárraga in the year 1615, and construction was done between 1618 and 1662, while basically following the originally approved plan.

Rojas became a pupil of the king's engineer Tibúrcio Spannocchi, and became especially interested in military architecture.
In 1586 he helped to review the fortifications of Gibraltar and Cadiz.
After that he become very active as a military engineer, designing and building forts in Spanish territories during the Brittany Campaign, including in North Africa.
In 1597 he finished his treatise on "Theory and Practice of Fortification", the first of its kind to be published in Spain. 
The text highlights the influence of the Italian School's polygonal and radio-concentric theories.

Rojas undertook important works in Sanlúcar de Barrameda including the famous carved stone facada of the Santo Domingo Church in this city, in the mannerist style, started in 1596 and completed ten years later. 
In his capacity as military architect and engineer he was appointed to rebuild and fortify the city of Cadiz after it had suffered a violent Anglo-Dutch assault and looting in 1596.
He rebuilt the old Church of Santa Cruz, ruined as a result of the looting. 
De Rojas designed and built the fort of Fort San Felipe on La Mamora, a Spanish possession in northern Morocco during much of the seventeenth century.

Rojas's most important work was the overall fortification of the city of Cadiz, the most ambitious military work in the country during the reigns of Philip II of Spain and Philip III of Spain, including important elements such as the castle of Santa Catalina, started in 1598. 
After his death in Cadiz in 1614, the fortifications of the city were continued by the military engineer Ignacio de Sala.

References
Citations

Sources

Further reading

Juan Jiménez Mata, Julio Malo de Molina: Guía de Arquitectura de Cádiz. Consejería de Obras Públicas y Transportes. Dirección General de Arquitectura y Vivienda. Colegio Oficial de Arquitectos de Andalucía Occidental, Demarcación de Cádiz. Año 1995.
Monumentos de la Provincia de Cádiz, pueblo a pueblo. Diario de Cádiz, Diario de Jerez, Europa Sur. Año 1997.

External links
The content of this article incorporates material from Cadizpedia published in Castilian under a Creative Commons Share-Alike license.

1555 births
1614 deaths
Spanish military engineers